The 1923–24 National Giants F.C. season was the second season for the club in the American Soccer League but its first season in New York after playing the previous season as Paterson F.C. Following the 1922-23 season, owner Adolph Buslik transferred the Paterson F.C. franchise to New York and renamed them the National Giants F.C.

At the end of February 1924, Buslik sold the franchise to Maurice Vandeweghe. Prior to the purchase, Vandeweghe had been part-owner and manager of New York S.C. The club's home grounds had been the Polo Grounds, but after the sale, the club played at New York Oval on alternating Sundays with New York S.C. The club finished the season in 6th place.

American Soccer League

Pld = Matches played; W = Matches won; D = Matches drawn; L = Matches lost; GF = Goals for; GA = Goals against; Pts = Points

National Challenge Cup

American Football Association Cup

Southern New York State Football Association Cup

Exhibitions

Notes and references
Bibliography

Footnotes

National Giants F.C.
American Soccer League (1921–1933) seasons
National Giants F.C.